is a Japanese politician, former speed skater and track cyclist. She has the most Olympic appearances of any Japanese athlete except Noriaki Kasai, representing her native country in four consecutive Winter Olympics from 1984 to 1994 and in three consecutive Summer Olympics from 1988 to 1996, making her a seven time Olympian.  On top of her Olympic career, she is the mother of six children while working in politics and other leadership positions. She is currently a member of the House of Councillors from the Liberal Democratic Party, and serves as the President of the Japan Skating Federation.

She served on the Japanese Cabinet as Minister of State for the Tokyo Olympic and Paralympic Games from September 2019 until February 2021, when she became the President of the Tokyo 2020 Organizing Committee. She is only the second female in Olympic history to become president of a game's organizing committee after Gianna Angelopoulos-Daskalaki, President of the Athens 2004 organizing committee.

Early life

Hashimoto was born in Hayakita, Hokkaido, in 1964.  

She is the youngest of four siblings, and her siblings are much older than her. There is a pond on the ranch of her parents' house, which freezes in the winter to make skating rink for her and her siblings to skate on. She skated on that frozen farm pond with their friends from elementary school. She was active as a top female skater for a long time amongst her peers. Her first skating coach was Mr. Akira Otani, who worked at the Hayakita Town Office and volunteered to teach children living in the neighborhood to skate. Akira Otani instructed her on skating from kindergarten to her first year of junior high school.

She graduated from a high school affiliated with Komazawa University in 1983 and joined the Fuji Kyuko railway company.

Father's influence 
Her father's name is Zenkichi Hashimoto (Japanese: 橋本善吉, Hepburn: Hashimoto Zenkichi, death October 2020 at the age of 96). She started speed skating by her father's parental influence. He wished her to be an Olympian. She grew up hearing from him that she was born to participate in the Olympics.Her father was a strict person in everything on sports and housework, and he taught her skating and horseback riding. Under his influence, she began speed skating at the age of three and became the best speed skater in Japan in her second year of high school.

Athletic career 
She appeared in her first Olympics in 1984 in Sarajevo, competing in 500, 1000, 1500 and 3000 m speed skating events. In the 1988 Winter Olympics in Calgary, she placed fifth in both the 500 and 1000 m speed skating events. She won the bronze medal in the 1500 m speed skating event in her third Winter Olympic appearance at the 1992 Winter Olympics in Albertville, France, and also competed in the 1994 Winter Olympics in Lillehammer, placing sixth in the 3000 m speed skating event.

Her first Summer Olympics appearance as a cycling sprinter was at the 1988 Summer Olympics in Seoul, where she placed fifth in the women's sprint. She placed eleventh in the 3000 m individual pursuit at the 1992 Summer Olympics in Barcelona, and ninth in the point race at the 1996 Summer Olympics in Atlanta.

Family life 

Hashimoto married a widowed police officer from the Diet of Japan in 1998, who brought three children into the marriage. Seiko Hashimoto kept her maiden name when she entered the House of Councilors, and her Husband changed his family name to Hashimoto as well, because in Japan, married couples must have the same last name.

She was the first lawmaker in Japan to give birth to her a child while in office in 2000, and later had 2 more children, becoming the mother of 6. Seiko Hashimoto gave birth to her three biological children after fertility treatments, and Seiko noted that (and advocated for) fertility treatment facilities gradually increasing access for fertility treatments compared to when she conceived her first biological daughter in 2000. She initially entrusted employees of her political office with the care of her children while at work but led an initiative to establish a childcare facility at the Diet of Japan, which opened in 2010.

Political career
Seiko deals with health issues in politics and a decline in birth rate, and she is the Minister in Charge of Women’s Empowerment. She hopes that young women participate in politics and that their voices should be directly reflected in it. As of 2020, the National Diet of Japan is 10.2% women.

Hashimoto resigned from Fuji Kyuko in 1993 and was elected to the House of Councilors in 1995, winning re-election in three subsequent elections. She competed in the Olympics while serving as a lawmaker in 1996. She served as Vice-Minister for Hokkaido Development from 2000 to 2001, as chair of the Education Committee from 2001 to 2003, as deputy secretary-general of the LDP from 2003, and as state secretary (senior vice-minister) for foreign affairs under the Taro Aso administration (2008–2009).

Following the resignation of Tokyo governor Naoki Inose on 19 December 2013, she was rumored to be a potential candidate for the gubernatorial election expected to be held in February 2014, along with Yuriko Koike, Hakubun Shimomura, Hideo Higashikokubaru and Yoichi Masuzoe. The LDP excluded her name from consideration in a December 20 telephone poll due to her responsibilities as head of the Japanese competitor delegation to the 2014 Winter Olympics. Seiko had to leave her position as on of 2 women on Prime Minister Yoshihide Suga's cabinet to accept her role in the 2020 Tokyo Olympics committee.

Olympic leadership 

In August 2014, Hashimoto became embroiled in accusations of sexual harassment of Japanese male figure skater Daisuke Takahashi. Weekly magazine Shukan Bunshun published a story with several photographs showing Hashimoto and Takahashi dancing at a party following the closing of the Sochi Winter Olympics. Several magazines said that she hugged and kissed him due to their unequal power dynamics, because she was on the Olympic committee, a politician, and a former Olympian herself. In contrast, Takahashi, known as the prince on ice in Japan, objected to the magazine's article and did not think that her behaviors are connected to sexual or power harassment. The story alleged that Hashimoto had kissed Takahashi several times despite the latter's obvious attempts to resist. Hashimoto denied the allegations. Takahashi's management also said that the popular skater had not been harassed.

In September 2019, Hashimoto became the Minister of State for Tokyo Olympic and Paralympic Games. On 18 February 2021, she stepped down from that role in order to take over as President of the Tokyo 2020 Organizing Committee. Hashimoto replaced former Prime Minister Yoshirō Mori, who had earlier offered his resignation following comments he made at a committee meeting that were regarded as sexist. Mori claims to have received criticism from his wife, daughter, and granddaughter for his statements. In response to his comments, many women lawmakers, as well as some men, wore white as a means protesting to express their disagreement with his comments  A few of Seiko Hashimoto's colleagues in the Diet of Japan made a petition for Mori's resignation.

In February 2022, she received the 2021 IOC Women and Sport Awards, which was presented to individuals or a group who has contributed to give opportunity, recognition, and empowerment foe women in sports. She was evaluated to promote gender equality, increasing the ratio of the female directors by roughly 40% in the Olympic Organizing Committee (OOC).

A nonpartisan sports all-party parliamentary group decided to launch an all-party parliamentary federation to invite the 2030 Sapporo Winter Olympics/ Paralympics. Seiko Hashimoto, The Tokyo Organising Committee of the Olympic and Paralympic Games serves as chairman again.

References

External links 
  
 Seiko Hashimoto - Prime Minister's Official Residence official website 
 
 
 

1964 births
Living people
Japanese female speed skaters
Japanese female cyclists
Speed skaters at the 1984 Winter Olympics
Speed skaters at the 1988 Winter Olympics
Speed skaters at the 1992 Winter Olympics
Speed skaters at the 1994 Winter Olympics
Olympic speed skaters of Japan
Cyclists at the 1988 Summer Olympics
Cyclists at the 1992 Summer Olympics
Cyclists at the 1996 Summer Olympics
Olympic cyclists of Japan
Medalists at the 1992 Winter Olympics
Olympic medalists in speed skating
Olympic bronze medalists for Japan
Recipients of the Olympic Order
Recipients of the Paralympic Order
Speed skaters at the 1986 Asian Winter Games
Speed skaters at the 1990 Asian Winter Games
Medalists at the 1986 Asian Winter Games
Medalists at the 1990 Asian Winter Games
Asian Games medalists in speed skating
Cyclists at the 1994 Asian Games
Medalists at the 1994 Asian Games
Asian Games medalists in cycling
Asian Games gold medalists for Japan
Asian Games bronze medalists for Japan
Female members of the House of Councillors (Japan)
Members of the House of Councillors (Japan)
Japanese sportsperson-politicians
Sportspeople from Hokkaido
Politicians from Hokkaido
World Allround Speed Skating Championships medalists
Members of Nippon Kaigi